Máté Tóth (born 20 Jun 1998 in Szombathely) is a Hungarian football player who currently plays for Mezőkövesd.

Club statistics

Updated to games played as of 15 May 2021.

References

External links
MLSZ 
HLSZ 

1998 births
Living people
Sportspeople from Szombathely
Hungarian footballers
Hungary youth international footballers
Association football defenders
Szombathelyi Haladás footballers
Mezőkövesdi SE footballers
Szeged-Csanád Grosics Akadémia footballers
Nemzeti Bajnokság I players